Lori L. Holt is a Professor of Psychology at Carnegie Mellon University.  She specializes in speech perception, focusing on how general perceptual and cognitive mechanisms contribute to speech perception and how speech can be used to broadly understand auditory cognition. In pursuit of these research areas, she employs human perceptual and learning paradigms as well as animal behavioral experiments and computational models.  Holt received a B.S. in psychology from the University of Wisconsin–Madison in 1995 and a Ph.D. in cognitive psychology with a minor in neurophysiology from UW–Madison in 1999, and she has been employed at Carnegie Mellon University and has been a member of the Center for the Neural Basis of Cognition ever since. Holt is the director of the Speech Perception & Learning Laboratory at Carnegie Mellon University. She was one of two recipients of the Troland Research Awards in 2013.

External links
Lori Holt's Homepage
Lori Holt's Biography - CMU Department of Psychology
Lori Holt's Speech Perception & Learning Laboratory

American women psychologists
American cognitive scientists
Speech perception researchers
University of Wisconsin–Madison College of Letters and Science alumni
Carnegie Mellon University faculty
Year of birth missing (living people)
Living people